Bastilla derogans is a moth of the family Noctuidae first described by Francis Walker in 1858. It is found in Africa, including Eswatini, South Africa, Réunion, São Tomé and Príncipe.

The larvae feed on Pinus species.

References

External links
Holloway, J. D. & Miller, Scott E. (2003). "The composition, generic placement and host-plant relationships of the joviana-group in the Parallelia generic complex". Invertebrate Systematics. 17: 111–128.

Bastilla (moth)
Moths of Madagascar
Lepidoptera of West Africa
Lepidoptera of Uganda
Lepidoptera of Malawi
Lepidoptera of Tanzania
Lepidoptera of Réunion
Moths of Africa
Insects of São Tomé and Príncipe
Moths described in 1858